En ettas dagbok is a 1982 Viveca Sundvall children's book, and the first book in the Mimmi series.  Written as a diary, it is set between 16 August-30 April the year Mimmi attends the first grade at school. Together with Roberta Karlsson och kungen and Vi smyger på Enok they were later all released in a collection called "Mimmis bok".

In 1985, a TV series based on the book was made.

Plot
Mimmi has begun the first grade at school. Their Elementary schoolteacher is called "Gullfröken". Mimmi's two years older friend goes to third grade. The janitor mostly seems to be angry.

References

Mimmis bok, Viveca Sundvall, Rabén & Sjögren, 1986

1982 children's books
Works by Viveca Lärn
1982 Swedish novels
Fictional diaries